is a 2006 mech simulator video game developed by FromSoftware and published by Sega for the Xbox 360. The game is set in an alternate universe where mecha known as HOUNDs battle for control of Neroimus, a fictional region near the Black Sea. Chromehounds features a system for personalized customization of the player's mecha and an online campaign mode where players wage war in a persistent world over Xbox Live. The game's online servers were shut down in January 2010.

Plot
The story chronologically takes place before the events of the Neroimus War depicted in multiplayer. The player character is given this role of an unnamed mercenary that’s this main character from Rafzekael who, over a course of six of these campaigns, and is shown various HOUND archetypes making this mercenary familiar with them. The first mission of each campaign acts as a tutorial for each HOUND archetype, with the Mercenary being instructed and manifested by a veteran Rafzekael mercenary named Edguardo Gillardino.

Throughout these six campaigns, the Mercenary witnesses the deteriorating situation in Neroimus, with small fighting between the factions increasing combat between nations. And the Mercenary realizes evidence of the conflict being intentionally escalated by an unknown third party. As the campaign continues, these skirmishes increase in severity from small guerrilla warfare to organized attacks against civilian populations. During some of these engagements, the Mercenary is attacked by other HOUNDs, further hinting at military involvement. During the Scout and Heavy Gunner campaigns, the Mercenary also engages two members of the Cerberus Squad, a legendary black ops HOUND unit known for these ruthless, but efficient tactics. At the conclusion of the campaigns, many factions believe the escalating attacks coupled with the reappearance of Cerberus are not coincidental, and that Neroimus is on the verge of war.

The final mission occurs some time after the six main campaigns. Following the constant skirmishing between nations, the Kingdom of Sal Kar begins to feel threatened. Claiming its borders are at stake, the Kingdom builds a forward base in the Tajin region, on the shared border of all three nations. The neighbouring nations of Morskoj and Tarakia denounce the action as aggressive and all 3 nations prepare for war. After the Sal Kari base is attacked, the Mercenary is dispatched to the region with a team of HOUNDs to investigate. Upon arrival, the Mercenary finds the base and the other HOUNDs destroyed by Cerberus, revealed to be led by Edguardo. The Mercenary engages the Cerberus Squad alone and destroys Edguardo’s HOUND. Before dying, Edguardo acknowledges the Mercenary’s skill but admits that the attack on the base has made war inevitable. With the base attack acting as the final straw, all 3 nations simultaneously declare war on each other, leading to the Neroimus War.

Gameplay
It offers opportunities for strategic thinking, as there are sometime multiple objectives for each mission. Both the single player and online game modes occupy a specific point in the game's timeline: the Single Player "Offline" story mode chronicles events just prior to the outbreak of the Neroimus War, while the Xbox Live "Online" mode takes place during the actual war.

There are six different mech classes known Role Types (RT for short) to choose from in Chromehounds. Each class of mech has seven different missions in the single-player campaign mode. Several types of other mechs and vehicles can be found including real world vehicles most notably; M1A1 Abrams, Leopard 1A5, T-72B1 and Merkava Mk.I main battle tanks.

Garage mode
Chromehounds features a garage mode where the player can customize HOUNDS. While the garages in each mode are functionally identical, HOUNDS constructed in single player are limited to the parts won in single player missions.

New parts for HOUNDs can be unlocked by completing single-player missions, purchased in in-game shops and some parts are available for free/pay download on Xbox Live Marketplace. Special parts can also be bid on in the Lottery. These include experimental parts developed by the player's own country, but have been discontinued by all three nations, and captured parts won in battle. Every day winners are chosen randomly and the bidding begins again. The selection of captured parts changes every day, and occasionally old experimental parts are moved to the normal shop and new ones are placed in the lottery to replace them. Bids are limited on a squad basis and higher ranked squads are allowed to place more bids (all experimental parts are now able to be purchased in the in-game shops, in their respective countries).

Neroimus War
The Neroimus War was an online campaign mode which involves the three countries fighting for the region of Neroimus. Players can join or make a squad, the equivalent of a clan or guild in other online games, to participate. The map of Neroimus is divided into several areas connected by paths. Each area is divided into several maps. Players may launch a mission within any enemy area adjacent to a friendly area, or in any friendly area which is under attack. Victory yields merit points, which raise your rank, captured parts for the lottery, and capture points. When a country has gained a certain amount capture points on a map, 25,000 to 32,000 for normal battlegrounds and 50,000 for capital cities, that map is turned over to the country. An area belongs to the country which has the most capture points in its maps. When a capital city falls, all areas under that country become part of the conquering country, and players may only fight to reclaim their capital, or seek asylum in another country. The War ends when one country controls the entire map or after two months have passed. After a war ends, squads may choose to change alliance to a different country, and then the next War begins. All of the experimental parts have become available, now only captured parts are available.

On August 7, 2009, Sega announced that the online servers would be shut down on January 6, 2010. From that point on, players were only able to access the offline mode.

Reception

The game received "average" reviews according to the review aggregation website Metacritic. Most gaming critics complimented the game's online play and customization options, but criticized it for having a poor story, average graphics, and slow-paced gameplay.  In Japan, Famitsu gave it a score of 33 out of 40, while Famitsu X360 gave it a score of one nine, two eights, and one seven for a total of 32 out of 40.

Maxim gave it a score of four stars out of five, saying, "Not unlike when you used to select frilly ensembles for your little sister's Barbie collection (when no one was looking), Chromehounds lets you play big, bad burly man." Detroit Free Press gave it three stars out of four and said that it "will suck you into its wartime world if you let it. And once you've adjusted to the game's quirks and interface, you'll find it very enjoyable." However, USA Today gave it a score of six-and-a-half stars out of ten, calling it "a war worth avoiding. Online play is enjoyable, and the details on the mechs are superb. But much like these giant metal 'soldiers,' the game lacks life." The Sydney Morning Herald gave it two-and-a-half stars out of five and said that it "offers a smattering of explosive action" as long as players "don't fall asleep at the wheel".

The game was awarded Game of the Month in the August 2006 issue of Newtype USA.

Spiritual Successor 
Two years after the shutdown of the online servers for Chromehounds, a spiritual successor to the game appeared. This spiritual successor was created by Bombdog Studios and released on the PC under the title of M.A.V. (Modular Assault Vehicle). Over the course of its development, a core community of old Chromehounds players has formed around the title.

References

External links
 

2006 video games
Products and services discontinued in 2010
Alternate history video games
FromSoftware games
Video games about mecha
Sega video games
Xbox 360 games
Xbox 360-only games
Inactive multiplayer online games
Video games scored by Kota Hoshino
Video games developed in Japan